Tarzan: Return to Pal-ul-don is a novel written by Will Murray featuring Edgar Rice Burroughs's jungle hero Tarzan. It is the first volume in The Wild Adventures of Tarzan, a series of new works authorized and licensed by Edgar Rice Burroughs, Inc. It was first published by Altus Press in June 2015 in trade paperback and ebook.

The book is a sequel to Burroughs's novel Tarzan the Terrible, in which the Ape Man visits the hidden valley of Pal-ul-don, a Jurassic Park-like area in Africa, during World War I.

Plot
During World War II, Tarzan reverts to his identity of John Clayton, Lord Greystoke, and resumes his military career as a pilot for the RAF. Flying a P-40 Tomahawk, Clayton is sent to rescue a missing British Military Intelligence officer, code-named Ilex. When his plane is brought down by a pteranodon over Pal-ul-don, his adventure returns him to the lost land, where he befriends the elephant Torn Ear and confronts the mysterious Turtle People. Eventually he even finds and recovers Ilex.

References

2015 American novels
2015 fantasy novels
American adventure novels
American fantasy novels